Wild West Tech is a program that aired on The History Channel in the United States from 2003 to 2005. The show was originally hosted by Keith Carradine (2003–04), but his half-brother, David Carradine, took over hosting duties for season 2 and subsequent seasons. The show illustrates a variety of technologies used in the Wild West, and features interviews with numerous Western historians, as well as re-creating versions of important events in Western history.

The series was created by Dolores Gavin (History Channel) and supervising producer Louis Tarantino.

Format

Each episode is dedicated to some broader aspect of Wild West life. Once the context is established in brief by the host, more specific elements are developed. Throughout the program, professors, writers, and other experts explain finer points while historical reenactments and dramatizations portray just how key 19th century events may have transpired. The production aims to put the viewer into the spirit of the Old West with its host inhabiting an unnamed frontier town, delivering commentary.

A new spin on the typical technology fact program, this program often covers subjects from the American Old West that are not generally discussed in more traditional settings. For example, one episode takes a look at the brothel, focusing on the inventions and technological innovations used to make the institution of prostitution less harsh on the lives of the women involved.

Another explains that Morphine was first isolated in 1803 by the German pharmacist Friedrich Wilhelm Adam Sertürner, but it was not until the development of the hypodermic needle (1853) that its use spread and it spread quite a bit in the American West. It was used for pain relief and as a "cure" for opium or alcohol addiction. Its extensive use during the American Civil War resulted in over 400,000 sufferers from the "soldiers disease" (addiction).

The same episode informs the viewers that heroin, along with other drugs, was only criminalized in the United States by the Harrison Narcotics Tax Act of 1914 decades after it was derived.

Other topics include the technological histories of various alcoholic beverages, saloons, weapons, and cowboy gangs.

Episode guide
Two pilot episodes were produced, hosted by Keith Carradine, to help sell the History Channel on the concept of the series. Seasons 2 and 3 were hosted by David Carradine.

Pilots

Season 1

Season 2

Season 3

External links
Episode guides
 

History (American TV channel) original programming
History of technology
2000s Western (genre) television series
American frontier